Pretty Prairie is a city in Reno County, Kansas, United States.  As of the 2020 census, the population of the city was 660.

History
The first post office at Pretty Prairie was established in 1874.

Pretty Prairie was laid out in 1889. It was named from its scenic setting upon the prairie. It was incorporated as a city in 1907.

The city's sole source of water is a single well, a 100-foot-deep borehole. Due to agricultural pollution from the region's groundwater, the well water has had nitrate levels in excess of the federal nitrate standard since the mid-1990s. For years, Pretty Prairie distributed bottled water to at-risk families. On January 3, 2017, the town council approved a settlement with the Kansas Department of Health and Environment and the EPA. The town planned to invest in a water tower, an underground storage tank, and a reverse osmosis water treatment system.

Geography
Pretty Prairie is located at  (37.780250, -98.018879).

Climate
The climate in this area is characterized by hot, humid summers and generally mild to cool winters. According to the Köppen Climate Classification system, Pretty Prairie has a humid subtropical climate, abbreviated "Cfa" on climate maps.

Demographics

2010 census
As of the census of 2010, there were 680 people, 272 households, and 190 families residing in the city. The racial makeup of the city was 96.0% White, 0.1% African American, 0.3% Native American, 0.1% Asian, 1.0% from other races, and 2.4% from two or more races. Hispanic or Latino people of any race were 3.1% of the population.

There were 272 households, of which 32.4% had children under the age of 18 living with them, 56.3% were married couples living together, 10.7% had a female householder with no husband present, 2.9% had a male householder with no wife present, and 30.1% were non-families. 27.6% of all households were made up of individuals, and 16.2% had someone living alone who was 65 years of age or older. The average household size was 2.36 and the average family size was 2.84.

The median age in the city was 42.4 years. 25.3% of residents were under the age of 18; 5.1% were between the ages of 18 and 24; 21.9% were from 25 to 44; 23.1% were from 45 to 64; and 24.6% were 65 years of age or older. The gender makeup of the city was 47.2% male and 52.8% female.

2000 census
As of the census of 2000, there were 615 people, 261 households, and 184 families residing in the city. The racial makeup of the city was 99.35% White, 0.16% Native American, 0.16% from other races, and 0.33% from two or more races. Hispanic or Latino people of any race were 1.63% of the population.

There were 261 households, out of which 31.0% had children under the age of 18 living with them, 61.3% were married couples living together, 7.7% had a female householder with no husband present, and 29.5% were non-families. 27.6% of all households were made up of individuals, and 16.5% had someone living alone who was 65 years of age or older. The average household size was 2.36 and the average family size was 2.86.

In the city, the population was spread out, with 26.2% under the age of 18, 5.5% from 18 to 24, 26.7% from 25 to 44, 17.4% from 45 to 64, and 24.2% who were 65 years of age or older. The median age was 41 years. For every 100 females, there were 102.3 males. For every 100 females age 18 and over, there were 94.8 males.

The median income for a household in the city was $32,857, and the median income for a family was $40,000. Males had a median income of $30,536 versus $18,125 for females. The per capita income for the city was $18,944. About 4.1% of families and 5.6% of the population were below the poverty line, including 4.1% of those under age 18 and 10.3% of those age 65 or over.

Education
The community is served by Pretty Prairie USD 311 public school district. It has three schools.

Notable people
 Brian Bergkamp, member of the Kansas House of Representatives
 Jon Gnagy, artist and television art instructor
 Walter Huxman, governor of Kansas and jurist; born in Pretty Prairie
 Carl "Alfalfa" Switzer, actor; played Alfalfa on the Little Rascals/Our Gang series, lived in the town in 1954 while briefly married to Collingwood Grain heiress Dian Collingwood
 Jack Unruh, artist and illustrator

See also
 Cheney State Park and Cheney Reservoir

References

Further reading

External links
 Pretty Prairie - Directory of Public Officials
 Pretty Prairie Rodeo, Kansas's largest night rodeo
 , from Hatteberg's People on KAKE TV news
 Pretty Prairie city map, KDOT

Cities in Reno County, Kansas
Cities in Kansas
1889 establishments in Kansas
Populated places established in 1889